Conquest Racing is an auto racing team that competed in the IndyCar Series and the Atlantic Championship. Formerly it competed in the Champ Car World Series.

History
It is owned by former series competitor Éric Bachelart. The team ran in Indy Lights competition in the late 1990s with Felipe Giaffone, who brought sponsorship from Hollywood cigarettes and Mi-Jack sponsored brothers Chris and Jamie Menninga. The team jumped to the Indy Racing League in 2002 with Laurent Rédon; the Frenchman won rookie of the year honors but was not retained when the team jumped ship to Champ Car in 2003 as he was wanted to come back to France for his family.

The team ran Mario Haberfeld in an unloved Reynard chassis and shared information and resources with Emerson Fittipaldi's team, that ran future Formula One driver Tiago Monteiro. In 2004 the team expanded to two cars, fielding Justin Wilson in a Lola with several others in a Reynard. Wilson signed with RuSPORT for 2005 and Conquest ran teenagers Nelson Philippe and Andrew Ranger, each 18 years old when the season started.

While Philippe left for 2006, the team retained Ranger dependent on his Canadian sponsorship and signed 2005 Champ Car Atlantic champion Charles Zwolsman to the second car. There were rumors Darren Manning would replace Ranger early in the season but this was put to rest with his on-track performances and more money coming into the team. Internet betting web site Goldenpalace.com signed on as Zwolsman's sponsor at the second race in Houston.

The team branched into the Atlantic ranks in 2006 with drivers Graham Rahal and Al Unser III.

After the 2006 season, Mike Lanigan pulled his company's support from the race team due to a lack of funding. In a Speedtv.com article, Bachelart was about to shut down his team when his sponsor called with a deal for the 2007 season. But on February 6, 2007 a New York-based company, later confirmed to be vodka company 42 Below, gave them sponsorship with former A1 Grand Prix driver Matt Halliday. However, after poor performances in Vegas, Long Beach, and Houston, Halliday was released in favor of Jan Heylen. Jan Heylen drove the next 9 races for Conquest Racing and his best finish was a 2nd place at the Bavaria Grand Prix of Holland. On October 3 it was announced that Jan Heylen would be replaced for the rest of the season by the returning Nelson Philippe.

In late December 2007 the team announced the signing of new marketing partner, Opes Prime Group Ltd, an Australian-based financial services provider. Following the unification of Champ Car and the Indy Racing League, Conquest was the first Champ Car team to confirm their participation in the IRL IndyCar Series, with driver Franck Perera named to drive one of the team's two cars. The other driver entry has been confirmed as Enrique Bernoldi will be driving for Conquest Racing during the 2008 IRL Championship.

However, on the eve of the opening race of the 2008 IndyCar Season, on 28 March 2008, Opes Prime was placed in receivership, and left the team shortly after. Sangari stepped up to sponsor both cars after Ares also left the team. After the Long Beach Grand Prix, Perera was replaced in the #34 car by Jaime Camara to complete a fully Brazilian lineup. Alex Tagliani replaced Bernoldi in the last three races of the season due to an injury.

Tagliani ran for the team part-time in 2009, including the Toronto Grand Prix that saw Tagliani lead a majority of the race before being eliminated in a late race crash. Conquest Racing entered a second car for the 2009 Indianapolis 500 with Bruno Junqueira the driver of the number 36. Junqueira qualified for the 500, while Tagliani did not, which resulted in Tagliani taking over the 36 car for the 500.

Nelson Philippe returned to the team late in 2009 after Tagliani and Conquest parted ways. The season was cut short for Phillipe and Conquest after a horrifying accident with Will Power at Infineon Raceway.

Mario Romancini was  announced as the driver of the Conquest Racing number 34 for the entire IndyCar Series 2010 schedule. Bertrand Baguette began running for the team in a second car at Barber, bringing Belgian sponsorship. The team placed both cars in the Indianapolis 500 where Romancini finished 13th and Baguette ended up in 22nd after losing a mirror early in the race. Conquest Racing planned to continue running both drivers for the remainder of the season but replaced Romancini with Francesco Dracone at Mid-Ohio and Infineon due to Romancini's lack of sponsorship.

For 2011, the team ran only one car, the 34, with Colombian driver Sebastián Saavedra.

In 2012, the team decided to leave the IndyCar series and enter the American Le Mans Series with a Morgan-Nissan LMP2 prototype. The team took its first victory at the 2012 Grand Prix of Mosport.

No more actively involved in motorsport since 2013 season, Conquest Racing comes back in IMSA Prototype Challenge for the 2019 season in LMP3 category.

Racing record

1Driver competed for Conquest in addition to another team that season.
2Only used for the Toyota Grand Prix of Long Beach.

Complete IRL IndyCar Series results
(key)

 Run to Champ Car specifications.
 Non-points-paying, exhibition race.
 The final race at Las Vegas was canceled due to Dan Wheldon's death.

Complete CART / Champ Car World Series results
(key)

References

External links
 Official Website
 IndyCar Team Page

IndyCar Series teams
Champ Car teams
Indy Lights teams
American auto racing teams
Atlantic Championship teams
American Le Mans Series teams